Sardar is a 1955 Indian film directed by Gyan Mukherjee. It stars Ashok Kumar, Bina Rai in lead roles.

Music

External links 
 

1955 films
1950s Hindi-language films
Films directed by Gyan Mukherjee
Indian biographical films
1950s biographical films
Indian black-and-white films